The Berkshire is an English breed of pig. It originated in the county of Berkshire, for which it is named. It is normally black, with some white on the snout, on the lower legs, and on the tip of the tail.

It is a rare breed in the United Kingdom. It has been exported to a number of countries including Australia, Japan, New Zealand and the United States, and is numerous in some of them.

History 

The Berkshire is thought to have originated in Reading, the county seat of Berkshire. It is one of the oldest breeds of pigs in England. It was the first breed to record pedigrees in herd books. Herds of the breed are still maintained in England by the Rare Breeds Survival Trust at Aldenham Country Park, Hertfordshire, and by the South of England Rare Breeds Centre in Kent. The Berkshire was listed as vulnerable in 2008; fewer than 300 breeding sows were known to exist at that time, but with the revived popularity of the breed through its connection to the Japanese marketing of a "wagyu for pork" connection, the numbers have increased.

Until the eighteenth century the Berkshire was a large tawny-coloured pig with lop ears, often with darker patches. In the late eighteenth and early nineteenth centuries it was substantially modified by cross-breeding with small black pigs imported from Asia.

Characteristics 

It is black with six white markings: four white socks, a white splash on the snout, and a white tip to the tail. It is prick-eared.

Berkshire pork, prized for juiciness, flavour, and tenderness, is pink-hued and heavily marbled. Its high fat content makes it suitable for long cooking and high-temperature cooking.  The meat also has a slightly higher pH, according to food science professor Kenneth Prusa of Iowa State University. Increased pH makes the meat darker, firmer, and more flavourful. High pH is a greater determinant than fat content in the meat's overall flavour characteristics.

In other countries

Japan

The Berkshire was first exported to Japan in the 1860s, and has become numerous there: in 2007 there were over 330,000. The Japanese Kagoshima Berkshire, which apparently derives from two British Berkshire pigs imported to Japan in the 1930s, is considered a separate breed; the meat may be marketed as Kurobuta pork, and command a premium price.

United States

In the United States, the American Berkshire Association, established in 1875, gives pedigrees only to pigs directly imported from established English herds or to those tracing directly back to such imported animals. The association was the first Swine Registry to be established and the first hog recorded was "Ace of Spades", a boar bred by Queen Victoria.

References

External links

 American Berkshire Association
 Berkshire Pig Breeders Club
 Oklahoma State University – Breeds of Livestock – Berkshire

History of Berkshire
Pig breeds originating in England
Animal breeds on the RBST Watchlist